Charlotte Delsinne (born 18 June 1986 in Lille) is a French professional squash player. As of April 2007, she was ranked number 89 in the world.

References

1986 births
Living people
French female squash players
21st-century French women